The 1970 United States Senate election in Mississippi was held on November 3, 1970. Incumbent Democratic U.S. Senator John C. Stennis won re-election to his fifth term, easily defeating independent candidate William Richard Thompson.

This race would be one of only two races where Stennis would face a general election challenger; as in his other races he had no general election opposition.

General election

Results

See also 
 1970 United States Senate elections

References 

1970
MIssissippi
1970 Mississippi elections